Strand is a municipality in Rogaland county, Norway. It is located in the traditional district of Ryfylke. The administrative centre of the municipality is the town of Jørpeland. The municipality lies across the fjord from the city of Stavanger. The Ryfast tunnel system connects Stavanger and Strand by a very long undersea tunnel.

The villages of Sørskår and Fiskå are located in northern Strand, on the southern shore of the Årdalsfjorden. This area of Strand produces fruit, vegetables, and dairy products. The Fiskå Mølle (Fiskå Mill) is located in Fiskå. The larger village of Tau is located on the western coast of Strand. It is a transportation hub with ferry connections to the city of Stavanger and bus services to nearby Hjelmelandsvågen and deeper into the Ryfylke district. This town is the largest settlement in Strand with about 7,000 people.

The  municipality is the 278th largest by area out of the 356 municipalities in Norway. Strand is the 91st most populous municipality in Norway with a population of 13,268.

The cross-country and marathon mountain biker Gunn-Rita Dahle comes from Bjørheimsbygd. She has won a gold medal in the Summer Olympics 2004, in Athens. Holtaheia was the mountain behind Holta farm where 34 school boys, 2 teachers and 3 crew died, when the Cunard Viking flight 'Papa Mike' crashed into the mountain, en route to Stavanger.

General information

The parish of Strand was established as a municipality on 1 January 1838 (see formannskapsdistrikt law). In 1865, the large district of Høgsfjord (population: 3,203) was separated from Strand to form a new municipality, leaving a much smaller Strand municipality. This left Strand with 2,228 residents. On 1 January 1965, the Sørskår-Sundgardene area (population: 121) was transferred from the neighboring municipality of Årdal to Strand. On 1 January 2020, the northwestern part of Forsand municipality was transferred to Strand (while the rest of Forsand was merged with Sandnes).

Name
The municipality (originally the parish) is named after the old Strand farm, since the first Strand Church was built there. The name is identical with the word strönd which means "strand" or "beach".

Coat of arms
The coat of arms was granted on 25 May 1973. The arms show three red water wheels on a gray background. The wheels are a symbol for the hydropower, which has been of importance to the municipality, first (since 1850) by using watermills, and now using modern hydro-electric plants.

Churches
The Church of Norway has two parishes within the municipality of Strand. It is part of the Ryfylke prosti (deanery) in the Diocese of Stavanger.

Geography
Strand is located on the mainland of Norway, on the south side of the vast Boknafjorden. The small islands of Idse and Idsal are located in the southwest part of Strand, between the Høgsfjorden and Idsefjorden. The small islands of Heng and Sør-Hidle lie in the large fjord between Strand and Stavanger. The lakes Tysdalsvatnet, Bjørheimsvatnet, and Vostervatnet are all located in Strand. The municipality of Hjelmeland lies to the north and east and Sandnes is to the south. The archipelago containing the islands of Stavanger Municipality lie to the northwest.

Government
All municipalities in Norway, including Strand, are responsible for primary education (through 10th grade), outpatient health services, senior citizen services, unemployment and other social services, zoning, economic development, and municipal roads. The municipality is governed by a municipal council of elected representatives, which in turn elect a mayor.  The municipality falls under the Sør-Rogaland District Court and the Gulating Court of Appeal.

Municipal council
The municipal council of Strand is made up of 29 representatives that are elected to four year terms. Currently, the party breakdown is as follows:

Industry
Scana Steel Stavanger AS is the largest company in Strand. Main activities include producing special steel alloys and casting for the shipping and oil/gas industry. Propellers of RMS Queen Mary 2 were made here. There are about 220 workers.

Comrod Communication ASA is a manufacturer of radio communication aerials. It makes deliveries to fisheries, shipping, oil and gas companies, and military defence. There are about 65 employees.

Culture
There are several festivals in Strand, including Ryfylke Ungdomsfestival (Ryfylke Youth Festival), Strandadagane (Strand Days) and Melting Pot (art seminar, mostly making decorative art out of scrap-iron). The annual race between Jørpeland and Tau, Strandamila, is an event which attracts hundreds of people. The race is along the highway, either by bike or on foot. Strand also has many sport facilities. There are a lot of football pitches spread around the municipality, as well as local fitness centres. Tau also has two tennis courts, a beach-volleyball field, and a basketball court, as well as Ryfylkehallen, the largest indoor football arena in the county of Rogaland.

Strand experienced a strong influx of newcomers from Stavanger and Jæren starting in the late 1970s. The original social fabric was divided into factory workers at the iron mill, farmers, and the strong Lutheran tradition. The divides were in many ways exclusive, and only limited movement between the social groups was seen. In later years these divides have become significantly weaker.

Notable people 

 Claus Winter Hjelm (1797 in Strand – 1871) a legal scholar, judge and Supreme Court Justice from 1843
 Aage Schavland (1806 in Strand – 1876) a priest and politician, Mayor of Herøy in 1840s/50s and Mayor of Trondheim in 1865
 John Moses (1885 in Strand – 1945) the 22nd Governor of North Dakota, 1939 to 1945
 Stein Rønning (1965 in Strand – 2008) a Norwegian karate master, won the 1990 World Karate Championships
 Silje Vige (born 1976 in Jørpeland) a Norwegian singer 
 Hugo Mikal Skår (born 1978) an actor
 Hadia Tajik (born 1983 in Bjørheimsbygd) a Pakistani-Norwegian jurist, journalist and politician
 Johnny Lodden (born 1985 in Jørpeland) a professional on-line poker player
 Pål Fjelde (born 1994 in Jørpeland) a Norwegian footballer with over 100 club caps
 Mathias Bringaker (born 1997) a footballer with over 100 club caps, brought up in Jørpeland

References

External links

Municipal fact sheet from Statistics Norway 
Region Stavanger - Ryfylke 

 
Municipalities of Rogaland
1838 establishments in Norway